Rudolf Österreicher, also Rudolf Oesterreicher, (19 July 1881 in Vienna – 23 October 1966 idem) was an Austrian writer, librettist, comedy author, author of cabaret texts and biographer.

Works 
Comedies:
 1907: Gummiradler
 1912: Das Bett Napoleons
 1913: Der Herr ohne Wohnung (with Bela Jenbach)
 1926: Der Garten Eden (with Rudolf Bernauer) - English-language adaptation: The Garden of Eden
 1927: Das zweite Leben (with Rudolf Bernauer)
 1928: Geld auf der Straße (with Rudolf Bernauer)
 1929: Die Sachertorte (with )
 1930: Das Konto X (with Rudolf Bernauer)

Operettas:
 1910: Ihr Adjutant; music by Robert Winterberg
 1917: Zsuzsi kisasszony, libretto with Alfred Maria Willner (based on Ferenc Martos and Miksa Bródy); music by Emmerich Kálmán
 1919: Der Künstlerpreis, libretto with Julius Horst; music by Leo Ascher
 1924: Das Weib im Purpur, libretto with Leopold Jacobson; music by Jean Gilbert
 1924: Die Geliebte Seiner Hoheit, libretto with Rudolf Bernauer; music by Jean Gilbert
 1926: Der Mitternachtswalzer, with Alfred Maria Willner; music by Robert Stolz
 1927: Yvette und ihre Freunde, libretto with Wilhelm Sterk; music by 
 1927: Eine einzige Nacht, libretto with Leopold Jacobson; music by Robert Stolz
 1949: , libretto with Hubert Marischka; music by Ludwig Schmidseder

Adaptation:
 Das Spitzentuch der Königin (Johann Strauss)

Filmography 
The Gentleman Without a Residence, directed by Fritz Freund (Austria, 1915, based on the play Der Herr ohne Wohnung)
The Gentleman Without a Residence, directed by Heinrich Bolten-Baeckers (Germany, 1925, based on the play Der Herr ohne Wohnung)
The Garden of Eden, directed by Lewis Milestone (1928, based on the play Der Garten Eden)
The Beloved of His Highness, directed by Luise Fleck and Jacob Fleck (Germany, 1928, based on the operetta Die Geliebte Seiner Hoheit)
Three Sinners, directed by Rowland V. Lee (1928, based on the play Das zweite Leben)
Der Mitternachtswalzer, directed by Heinz Paul (Austria, 1929, based on the operetta Der Mitternachtswalzer)
Money on the Street, directed by Georg Jacoby (Germany, 1930, based on the play Geld auf der Straße)
, directed by Hans Steinhoff (Germany, 1931, based on the operetta Zsuzsi kisasszony)
Once a Lady, directed by Guthrie McClintic (1931, based on the play Das zweite Leben)
The Office Manager, directed by Hans Behrendt (Germany, 1931, based on the play Das Konto X)
Her Majesty, Love, directed by William Dieterle (1931, remake of the 1931 film Her Majesty the Barmaid)
The Gentleman Without a Residence, directed by E. W. Emo (Austria, 1934, based on the play Der Herr ohne Wohnung)
Who's Your Lady Friend?, directed by Carol Reed (UK, 1937, based on the play Der Herr ohne Wohnung)
Ducháček Will Fix It, directed by Karel Lamač (Czechoslovakia, 1938, based on the play Das Konto X)
, directed by Hans Wolff (Austria, 1958, based on the play Die Sachertorte)
Das Geld liegt auf der Straße, directed by Klaus Überall (West Germany, 1966, TV film, based on the play Geld auf der Straße)

Screenwriter
 (dir. Richard Oswald, 1915, Germany)
Her Majesty the Barmaid (dir. Joe May, 1931, German)
His Highness Love (dir. Robert Péguy, Erich Schmidt, and Joe May, 1931, French)
Hirsekorn greift ein (dir. Rudolf Bernauer, 1931, Germany)
The Magic Top Hat (dir. Rudolf Bernauer, 1932, Germany)
 (dir. Fritz Schulz, 1934, Hungary; German-language adaptation of the 1934 film )
Kissing Is No Sin (dir. Hubert Marischka, 1950, Austria/West Germany)
The Merry Farmer (dir. Georg Marischka, 1951, Austria)
 (dir. Franz Antel, 1952, Austria)
Rose of the Mountain (dir. Hubert Marischka, 1952, West Germany)
A Night in Venice (dir. Georg Wildhagen, 1953, Austria)
Die Perle von Tokay (dir. Hubert Marischka, 1954, Austria)
Brillanten aus Wien (dir. Rolf Kutschera, TV film, 1959, Austria/West Germany)
Die Gigerln von Wien (dir. Wolfgang Glück, TV film, 1965, Austria)

Sources 
 Christian Fastl: Oesterreicher (Österreicher), Rudolf. In Oesterreichisches Musiklexikon. Inline-edition, Vienna 2002 ff., ; Druckausgabe: Volume 4, edition of the Austrian Academy of Sciences, Vienna 2005, .
 Rudolf Oesterreicher in Vienna History Wiki

References

External links 
 
 

1881 births
1966 deaths
Writers from Vienna
Austrian male dramatists and playwrights
Austrian operetta librettists
Austrian theatre directors
20th-century Austrian dramatists and playwrights
20th-century Austrian male writers
20th-century Austrian screenwriters